Princess Margarita Maria Beatrix of Bourbon-Parma, Countess of Colorno (born 13 October 1972), is the eldest daughter of Princess Irene of the Netherlands and Carlos Hugo, Duke of Parma. She is a member of the House of Bourbon-Parma as well an extended member of the Dutch royal family. Per a 1996 royal decree issued by Queen Beatrix, she is entitled to the style and title Her Royal Highness Princess Margarita de Bourbon de Parme in The Netherlands as a member of the extended royal family.

Early life
Born in Nijmegen, she is the twin sister of Prince Jaime. She also has an elder brother, Prince Carlos, and a younger sister, Princess Carolina. Her godparents are Queen Beatrix of the Netherlands (maternal aunt) and Prince Sixtus Henry of Bourbon-Parma (paternal uncle). She is the eldest granddaughter of Queen Juliana and Prince Bernhard.

In 1981, her parents divorced. Together with her mother and her siblings she moved from Spain to The Netherlands, to live with her grandparents, Queen Juliana of the Netherlands and Prince Bernhard of Lippe-Biesterfeld at Baarn. Later she moved to Wijk bij Duurstede. Margarita studied Cultural Anthropology at the Vrije Universiteit of Amsterdam and is an interior decorator. She studied interior architecture in The Hague.

First marriage and controversy
On 19 June 2001, Princess Margarita married the entrepreneur Edwin Karel Willem de Roy van Zuydewijn, member of a Dutch patrician family. The civil marriage of the couple took place in Amsterdam, and the Roman Catholic marriage was held in Auch Cathedral (France), presided by Ronald Philippe Bär, the former Bishop of Rotterdam, on 22 September 2001. De Roy van Zuydewijn was however not trusted by the Dutch Royal Family, and the marriage was therefore not attended by its senior members.

In 2003, a series of incidents had become known as the Margarita-affair. In the media Margarita and her husband accused the Dutch Royal House and the Dutch secret service of obstructing the affairs of Fincentives, the company of de Roy van Zuydewijn. They also said that their telephone conversations had been secretly tapped. After some while it was revealed that the Queen's personal Cabinet had indeed ordered an investigation; the right to do so was legally removed from the Queen.

The couple's home was the Bartas Castle in Saint-Georges, Gers, France, but by 2004 the princess was increasingly less seen there and more in Amsterdam. On 13 August 2004, it was revealed that she was filing for a divorce; the official divorce was signed on 8 November 2006. The marriage did not produce any children.

Because of the quarrels between the princess and the Dutch Royal family during the Margarita-affair, she was not welcome at the marriage of her cousin Willem-Alexander, Prince of Orange to Máxima Zorreguieta, or at the funeral of her uncle, Prince Claus of the Netherlands. However, after her divorce from De Roy van Zuydewijn, the relationship with the royal family steadily improved again.

Second marriage and family

On 3 May 2008, she married Tjalling Siebe ten Cate (born 23 December 1975, in Dordrecht), a lawyer at De Nederlandsche Bank (the Dutch National Bank), also a member of a Dutch patrician family. On 20 February 2023, Princess Margarita and Ten Cate announced their divorce. Together they have two children:
Julia Carolina Catharina ten Cate (born 3 September 2008 in Amsterdam)
Paola Cecilia Laurentien ten Cate (born 25 February 2011 in The Hague) Her godmother is Princess Laurentien of the Netherlands.

Margarita currently lives in Wassenaar.

Princess Margarita is the godmother of the three of her nieces: Princess Cecilia of Bourbon-Parma, daughter of her brother Carlos, Duke of Parma, Princess Zita Clara of Bourbon-Parma, daughter of her twin brother Prince Jaime, Count of Bardi and Alaïa-Maria Brenninkmeijer, daughter of her only sister Princess Carolina, Marchioness of Sala.

Titles, styles and honours
Already a ducal princess from birth, her father bestowed on 2 September 1996 the substantive title Contessa di Colorno (Countess of Colorno) upon her. The same year she was incorporated into the Dutch nobility by her aunt Queen Beatrix, with the highest noble title Prinses de Bourbon de Parme (Princess of Bourbon-Parma) and styled Hare Koninklijke Hoogheid (Her Royal Highness). She does not belong to the House of Orange-Nassau or the limited Dutch royal house, but as a granddaughter of Queen Juliana, she is officially a member of the more extended Dutch royal family.

Honours
  Ducal Family of Parma: Knight of the Parmese Sacred Military Constantinian Order of Saint George
  Ducal Family of Parma: Knight Grand Cross of the Order of Saint Louis for Civil Merit
 : Recipient of the King Willem-Alexander Investiture Medal

Ancestry

References

External links

Official website of the House of Bourbon-Parma
Second official website of the House of Bourbon-Parma
Biography of Her Royal Highness Princess Margherita Maria

People from Nijmegen
Princesses of Bourbon-Parma
Dutch princesses
Dutch nobility
Italian nobility
20th-century Spanish nobility
Dutch twins
1972 births
Living people